Master D. M. L. is an unidentified German painter of the Renaissance period.

The name assigned to him is derived from the artists insignia D. M. L. on a portrait of Martin Luther. The artist is said to be a follower of Lucas Cranach the elder from the 16th or 17th century, and obviously was interpreting portrait types as invented by Cranach. Besides of the Luther portrait, also a portrait of Philipp Melanchthon by the anonymous artist is known.

References
Portrait of Martin Luther, DE AGGD 440, Description in Cranach Digital Archive (accessed April 4, 2012)
Painting with artist's insignia above the sitter's head from Cranach Digital Archive

16th-century German painters
17th-century German painters
D. M. L.